Víctor Estrella Burgos was the three-time defending champion and the tournament's only champion to date, but lost in the second round to Gerald Melzer.

Roberto Carballés Baena won his first ATP title, defeating Albert Ramos Viñolas in the final, 6–3, 4–6, 6–4.

Seeds
The top four seeds receive a bye into the second round.

Draw

Finals

Top half

Bottom half

Qualifying

Seeds
The top two seeds receive a bye into the qualifying competition.

Qualifiers

Lucky loser
  Alessandro Giannessi

Qualifying draw

First qualifier

Second qualifier

Third qualifier

Fourth qualifier

References
 Main Draw
 Qualifying Draw

2018 ATP World Tour
2018 Singles